Myrmecomantis is a genus of praying mantises in the family Nanomantidae. It is monotypic, being represented by the single species, Myrmecomantis atra, commonly known as the ant mantis. It is a species  that relies upon ant mimicry for protection even as an adult.

See also
List of mantis genera and species

References

Nanomantidae